The Reserve Infantry Division of Hohhot() was a reserve infantry formation of the People's Liberation Army active between 1983 and 1999.

The Reserve Division of Hohhot was formally activated on September 17, 1983, in Hohhot, Inner Mongolia. The division was then composed of:
1st Regiment - Saihan District
2nd Regiment
3rd Regiment - Togtoh County
Tank Regiment - Huimin District
Artillery Regiment - Hohhot

In 1985 the division was redesignated as the Reserve Infantry Division of Hohhot(). In 1986, Tank Regiment was reorganized into the Artillery Regiment, Reserve Infantry Division of Hohhot.

In October 1999, the division merged with the 30th Infantry Brigade to form the 30th Reserve Infantry Division of Inner Mongolia().

References

Reserve divisions of the People's Liberation Army
Military units and formations established in 1983